The 1951 NCAA Men's Ice Hockey Tournament was the culmination of the 1950–51 NCAA men's ice hockey season, the 4th such tournament in NCAA history. It was held between March 15 and 17, 1951, and concluded with Michigan defeating Brown 7-1. All games were played at the Broadmoor Ice Palace in Colorado Springs, Colorado.

This was the last tournament to include only independent schools. (As of 2016)

Qualifying teams
Four teams qualified for the tournament, two each from the eastern and western regions. The teams were selected by a committee based upon both their overall record and the strength of their opponents.

Format
The eastern and western teams judged as better were seeded as the top regional teams. The second eastern seed was slotted to play the top western seed and vice versa. All games were played at the Broadmoor Ice Palace. All matches were Single-game eliminations with the semifinal winners advancing to the national championship game and the losers playing in a consolation game.

Bracket

Note: * denotes overtime period(s)

Results

Semifinals

Michigan vs. Boston University

Brown vs. Colorado College

Consolation Game

Boston University vs. Colorado College

National Championship

(W1) Michigan vs. (E1) Brown

All-Tournament team

First Team
G: Donald Whiston* (Brown)
D: Bob Heathcott (Michigan)
D: Jim Starrak (Colorado College)
F: Gil Burford (Michigan)
F: Neil Celley (Michigan)
F: John Matchefts (Michigan)
* Most Outstanding Player(s)

Second Team
G: Hal Downes (Michigan)
D: Jim Sutherland (Brown)
D: John Murphy (Brown)
F: Jack Garrity (Boston University)
F: Al Gubbins (Brown)
F: Omer Brandt (Colorado College)

References

Tournament
NCAA Division I men's ice hockey tournament
NCAA Men's Ice Hockey Tournament
NCAA Men's Ice Hockey Tournament
1950s in Colorado Springs, Colorado
Ice hockey competitions in Colorado Springs, Colorado